ICEfaces is an open-source Software development kit that extends JavaServer Faces (JSF) by employing Ajax.  It is used to construct rich Internet applications (RIA) using the Java programming language.  With ICEfaces, the coding for interaction and Ajax on the client side is programmed in Java, rather than in JavaScript, or with plug-ins.

Architecture 
ICEfaces is designed to work with Java EE servers, encapsulating Ajax calls. ICEfaces is based on the JavaServer Faces standard, it extends some standard components supplemented with in-built Ajax.  ICEfaces allows partial submits.  It also provides "Ajax Push", a variant of Comet capability, that can update the DOM of a web page from the server-side.

Comparable frameworks 
 Apache MyFaces
 Echo
 ADF Faces
 PrimeFaces
 RichFaces
 Vaadin
 ZK

References

Bibliography

External links 

  ICEfaces Home Page
   Inherent AJAX Security with Java and JSF
  ICEfaces
  License FAQ
   ICEfaces and Spring 2.5 in Java EE
  MyEclipse ICEfaces Tutorial

Jakarta Server Faces
Web frameworks
Ajax (programming)